Juturnia is a genus of very small freshwater snails, aquatic gastropod mollusks in the family Cochliopidae.

Species
Species within the genus Juturnia include:
Juturnia coahuilae (D. W. Taylor, 1966)

References

Cochliopidae